Rapala damona  is a butterfly in the family Lycaenidae. It was described by Charles Swinhoe in 1890. It is found in the Indomalayan realm, where it has been recorded from the Andamans, northern India, Myanmar, from Thailand to Peninsular Malaysia, Singapore, Sumatra, Java and Lombok.

References

External links

Rapala (butterfly)
Butterflies described in 1890